Mount Michelson is a high peak in the Romanzof Mountains, part of the Brooks Range of northern Alaska in the United States.

The mountain was named by E. de K. Leffingwell, between 1906 and 1914, for Professor Albert Abraham Michelson, an American scientist.

Notes

Mountains of Alaska
Mountains of North Slope Borough, Alaska
Brooks Range